Bignon is a surname. Notable people with the surname include:

Armand-Jérôme Bignon (1711–1772), French lawyer, royal librarian and conseiller d'État
Jean-Paul Bignon, (1662–1743), French ecclesiastic, statesman, writer, preacher, and librarian to Louis XIV of France
Jérôme Bignon (1589–1656), French lawyer born in Paris
Jérôme Bignon (politician) (born 1949), member of the National Assembly of France
Louis Bignon (1816–1906), famous French chef whose Café Riche became the most fashionable in Paris
Louis Pierre Édouard, Baron Bignon (1771–1841), French diplomat and historian
Michel Bignon (1891–1926), French equestrian
Roger Bignon (born 1935), French field hockey player
Víctor Bignon (1925–2007), Chilean boxer

See also
Le Bignon, commune in the Loire-Atlantique department in western France
Le Bignon-du-Maine, commune in the Mayenne department in northwestern France
Le Bignon-Mirabeau, commune in the Centre region of France
Chevry-sous-le-Bignon, commune in the Loiret department in north-central France
Bignon Commission (1693–1718), group established to examine the feasibility of compiling a description of arts and industrial processes in France
Bignon Commission (French Revolution) (1793–1794), French military tribunal that terrorized Nantes during the French Revolution
Bignona
Bignonia
Brignon